Slightly Static is a 1935 American short comedy film directed by William H. Terhune. It was the debut film of Roy Rogers who performed with the Sons of the Pioneers although his name was uncredited. It is the 17th entry in the series.

Cast
Thelma Todd...  Thelma 
Patsy Kelly ...  Patsy 
Harold Waldridge ...  Mr. Campbell's Son, Elmer 
Dell Henderson ...  Mr. Campbell (as Del Henderson) 
The Randall Sisters ...  Vocal Trio (as Randall Sisters) 
Sons of the Pioneers ...  Male Singers

References

External links 
 

1935 films
1935 comedy films
Hal Roach Studios short films
American black-and-white films
American comedy short films
1930s English-language films
1930s American films